Located Baltimore, Maryland in Maryland, United States, Montibello.

Montibello was the home of Samuel Smith, (July 27, 1752 – April 22, 1839) was a United States Senator and Representative from Maryland, a mayor of Baltimore, Maryland, and a general in the Maryland militia. He was the brother of cabinet secretary Robert Smith.

The house was built in 1799 and torn down in 1907. It was situated where the modern Lake Montibello resides.

See also
Susquehanna Conduit

References

Houses in Baltimore
History of Maryland